Pujiang County is a county of Sichuan Province, China, it is under the administration of the prefecture-level city of Chengdu, the provincial capital.

Geography
Pujiang County is in the Southwest part of the Sichuan Basin and in the area from East longitude 103°19′to 103°41′ and from North latitude 30°05′ to 30°20′. It borders Pengshan and Meishan in the east, Mingshan in the west, Danlin (Danleng County) in the south, and Qionglai City in the north, stretching 37 kilometers from east to west and 27.5 kilometers from north to south.

History
In the 4th century BC the Qin Kingdom annexed the Shu Kingdom and established Puyang county in the Pushui area. In the Han Dynasty, Puyang county was eliminated and affiliated with Linyi county. In 554 AD, it was built as Guangding county and in 601 AD the name was changed to Pujiang. The county was originally located in Lixudi in the north and during the Hongwu Emperor reign, the emperor moved the county to what is now Heshan town under the jurisdiction of Qiongzhou, and later under Meishan, then Wenjiang. In 1983 it was put under the administration of the city of Chengdu.

Industrial area
The urban district, Pujiang Centralized Area for Industrial Development, is near to Chendu-Ya'an Highway, 68 kilometers from Chengdu. The area is the only processing center for agriculture by-products at the state level in Chengdu. The size is approximately 6 square kilometers and the shorter-term development area is 5.4 square kilometers. Its emphasis is on developing food drinking biology, medicine, light industry, manufacturing, and other high technology ventures.

Climate

References

Further reading
 Official gov't website
 "2,500-year-old Boat Coffin Reveals Hidden History", Xinhua News Agency, December 15, 2006."With abundant cultural relics, a boat-shaped coffin dating back nearly 2,500 years has been unearthed in Feilong Village near Heshan Town in Sichuan's Pujiang County, raising expectations that it may reveal the true history of a long-lost kingdom in the area."

 
Geography of Chengdu
County-level divisions of Sichuan